Legend Quest may refer to:
 Legend Quest (2011 TV series)
 Legend Quest (2017 TV series)
 LegendQuest, a tabletop role-playing game published in 1991